Imirim is a neighborhood in the northern zone of São Paulo city, State of São Paulo, in Brazil. Its birthday is celebrated on May 13. Its official day was originally sanctioned by Law # 12 789, 1999, having been repealed by this Law 14 485, of July 19, 2000.

References 

Neighbourhoods in São Paulo